Derek Stingley Jr. (born June 20, 2001) is an American football cornerback for the Houston Texans of the National Football League (NFL). He played college football at LSU and was selected third overall by the Texans in the 2022 NFL Draft.

Early years
Stingley Jr. attended The Dunham School in Baton Rouge, Louisiana. During his high school career he had 27 career interceptions. As a senior, he was named the Louisiana Gatorade Football Player of the Year. Stingley Jr. was rated as a five-star recruit and was ranked as the top overall player in his class by Rivals.com. He committed to Louisiana State University (LSU) to play college football.

College career
Stingley Jr. entered his freshman year at LSU in 2019 as a starter, helping the team go undefeated and win the College Football National Championship. As a freshman, he led the Southeastern Conference (SEC) with six interceptions, 21 passes defended and was a first-team All-SEC selection by the Associated Press (AP). He was also a consensus All-American, earning first-team honors from the AP, American Football Coaches Association, The Sporting News, Sports Illustrated, ESPN, and USA Today.  In the following season, Stingley missed three games due to illness and injuries, but still was named to the All-SEC first-team. Following an injury plagued junior season in which he was only able to start in three games, Stingley declared for the 2022 NFL Draft.

College statistics

Professional career

Stingley Jr. was selected in the first round with the third overall pick by the Houston Texans in the 2022 NFL Draft, tying the record set by Shawn Springs and Jeff Okudah for the highest draft selection by a cornerback in NFL history.  He entered his rookie season as a starting cornerback opposite Steven Nelson. He had his first career interception in Week 5 against the Jaguars. He finished the season with 43 tackles, five passes defensed and one interception through nine games.

Personal life
His father, Derek Stingley Sr., played in the Arena Football League while his grandfather, Darryl Stingley, played with the New England Patriots in the National Football League.

References

External links
 Houston Texans bio
LSU Tigers bio

2001 births
Living people
Players of American football from Baton Rouge, Louisiana
American football cornerbacks
LSU Tigers football players
All-American college football players
Houston Texans players